Hernandia lychnifera is a species of plant in the Hernandiaceae family. It is endemic to Ecuador.  Its natural habitats are subtropical or tropical moist lowland forests and subtropical or tropical moist montane forests.

References

Hernandiaceae
Endemic flora of Ecuador
Endangered plants
Taxonomy articles created by Polbot